is a regional bank serving Okinawa Prefecture in Japan.

It was founded in 1948 by order of the U.S. military administration of Okinawa to serve as a central bank for occupied Okinawa, and was originally modeled after the Federal Reserve System of the United States and the Central Bank of the Philippines. During the U.S. administration, it was empowered to issue currency and oversee the financial administration of Okinawa in addition to serving as a commercial and retail bank. Following the repatriation of Okinawa in 1972, it was reorganized as a regional bank. It had an initial public offering on the Tokyo Stock Exchange in 1983.

References

Banks established in 1948
Regional banks of Japan
Japanese companies established in 1948
Companies based in Okinawa Prefecture
Companies listed on the Tokyo Stock Exchange
Companies listed on the Fukuoka Stock Exchange